Warley is a suburb of Brentwood in Essex, situated to the south of the town. It was notable for being home to the British headquarters of Ford Motor Company prior to their office closure.

It is also home to a development of houses situated around and near the former site of Warley Hospital (a psychiatric hospital), called Clements Park. The development includes a range of house styles modelled around local themes, such as the former water tower that supplied the local area. In 2015  the former site of all the buildings and their architectural features of Warley Hospital was sensitively restored creating high specification homes which secured the heritage asset which was once on the heritage at risk register, known as The Galleries.

There was also another prominent psychiatric hospital in Warley for over 150 years, known as Mascalls Park Mental Hospital, although its operations were moved to Goodmayes Hospital in early 2011.

There is a Borough of Brentwood council ward by the name Warley, which takes in Great Warley, Little Warley, Childerditch and the Woodman Road/Hartswood area of Brentwood. It has in recent years elected three Liberal Democrat and one Conservative councillor.

Military history

The military has associations with Warley going back over 200 years. It also had strategic importance during the time of the Spanish Armada – it was used as a meeting place for contingents from eight eastern and midland counties (900 horsemen assembled here) to then travel on to Tilbury. The local common was used as a military camp in 1742, and became a permanent feature as Warley Barracks in 1804.

The Essex Regiment Chapel is located in Eagle Way.() The chapel was built in 1857 and is a Grade II listed building. It was originally built for the East India Company, but with the establishment of the Essex Regiment Depot at Warley, the chapel became the regiment's "home" church. The chapel's interior contains displays of regimental history, memorials, heraldry and regimental colours. The chapel is open by appointment, and on regimental heritage days.

The chapel is near the Warley (Brentwood) Army Reserve drill hall, which is the headquarters of 124 Petroleum Squadron, part of 151 (London) Transport Regiment of the Royal Logistic Corps. 

The site of the old regimental depot and barracks was redeveloped in the 1960s for the headquarters of the Ford Motor Company (architect T.P. Bennett). This closed in 2019 and is being redeveloped. Most of the barracks have been demolished and only the chapel, the officers' mess (now Marillac Nursing Home) and one of the regimental gyms (Keys Hall) remain.

References

Populated places in Essex
Brentwood (Essex town)